The Privilege is a 2022 German film directed by Felix Fuchssteiner and Katharina Schöne, written by Felix Fuchssteiner, Sebastian Niemann, Katharina Schöde and Eckhard Vollmar and starring Max Schimmelpfennig, Lise Risom Olsen and Caroline Hartig. It was released by Netflix on February 9, 2022.

Cast 
In order of appearance, not billing:
 Lise Risom Olsen as Yvonne Bergmann
 Caroline Hartig as Anna
 Roman Knizka
 Nadeshda Brennicke
 Mike Hoffmann
 Janina Agnes Schröder
 Swetlana Schönfeld
 Dieter Bach as Agent Trondthal
 Jan Andreesen
 Christine Rollar
 Laurenz Wiegand as Sanitäter / Notarzt
 Christof Düro as Polizist
 Leonas Sielaff
 Tijan Marei as Samira

References

External links
 
 

2022 films
2020s German-language films
German horror films
German-language Netflix original films
2020s German films